Our Lady of the Chinese Shop is a 2022 Angolan drama film written and directed by Ery Claver on his directorial feature film debut. The film was set in the backdrop of Luanda. The film storyline is based on the colonialism, imperialism, religion and national malaise. The film largely portrayed novice actors who were largely unknown in film fraternity but were praised for their authentic performances despite lack of interaction throughout the film. The director of the film decided to take a subtle dig at China's gawing influence over Angola through this film by portraying the story of a Chinese merchant's opportunism. The film was produced by Geração 80.

However, the film was criticised for its slow phased screenplay, obsure plots and lack of dialogues but was praised for its visual storytelling and poetic narration with some critics calling the film similar to a documentary version. The film was screened as part of the First Feature Competition at the 2022 London Film Festival in October 2022. It was also screened in Red Sea Film Festival and at the Film Festival Gent. According to The Africa Report, it was ranked among top ten most notable African films of 2022.

Synopsis 
The characters have one thing in common as they encounter with a plastic statue of the Virgin Mary which was put for megasale by a power-hungry Chinese merchant. The Chinese merchant exploits the majority of Catholicism in Angola and intends to rake huge sums of profits through the Virgin Mary doll which was shipped into Luanda from an overseas nation and the Virgin Mary doll would soon go on to make profound effects on the inhabitants in Angola.

Cast 

 Claudia Pukuta as Domingas
 Willi Ribeiro as Zoyo
 David Caracol Bessa
 Liu Xuibing as shopkeeper
 Tobiasa the dog

Production 
The film was predominantly and entirely shot and set in Luanda. The principal photography of the film began during the middle of the COVID-19 pandemic in 2020 and the film was shot with just two main actors. The film was bankrolled by the Angolan filmmaking collective Geração 80 which was its second fiction feature film.

References

External links 

 
 

Angolan drama films
2022 films
2022 drama films
2022 directorial debut films
Films postponed due to the COVID-19 pandemic
Films shot in Angola
Films set in Angola
Portuguese-language films
2020s Portuguese-language films